Alizé is a line of alcoholic drinks. It is produced in several varieties that can be consumed neat or can be used in mixed drinks. As of 2020, the line consists of eight vodka-based liqueurs, all of which are 16% alcohol (32 US proof). The products are Alizé Gold Passion, Red Passion, Bleu Passion, Peach, Apple, Pink Passion, Pineapple, and Mango. Each of these liqueurs is a blend of French vodka, passion fruit juice, and other exotic fruit juices.

History
In 1984 Alizé was introduced by the Kobrand Corporation at the Wine and Spirits Wholesalers of America convention in New Orleans. A common company known as L & L was created to produce and distribute Alizé. In 1986, Alizé Gold Passion was introduced in the United States, initially targeting 45- to 55-year-old white women. It did not sell well until the mid-90s when its price was dropped from $45 to $16 per bottle and started to appear in rap videos such as Tupac Shakur's "Thug Passion".

The packaging of Alizé has undergone three major changes: a new bottle shape and an updated label with foil imprinting and a larger name in 2002, followed by a frosted bottle and silk screened label in 2006, and the transition to a clear bottle for all flavors in 2007.

Advertising
Throughout the 1990s, Alizé’s advertising involved promotions such as a Culinary Mentorship Challenge, which offered the grand prize of a month-long study program at Le Cordon Bleu; another promotion was “Operation Redhead”, a collaboration with Manic Panic, that gave 250 winners the opportunity to become redheads via a special-edition hue of hair dye. From 2016 to 2017, Alizé sponsored the Tupac Shakur biopic “All Eyez on Me”. In 2018, they partnered with The Doughnut Project to create a (limited-time only) rose-colored doughnut with crème filling, topped with an Alizé Pink liqueur and lime glaze, complete with a candied lime finish.

Wendy Williams was the spokesperson for Alizé from 2006 to 2007. Her activities included a 5-city national tour called Alizé LIVE! Presents The Wendy Williams Experience, highlighting her signature radio show.

Varieties
Alizé Gold Passion, the "original" Alizé, is a blend of passion fruit juice and other fruits blended with cognac (and now vodka). It was introduced in 1986.
Alizé Red Passion, introduced in 1998, is a combination of the original Gold Passion with cranberry and peach.
Alizé Bleu Passion, introduced in 2004, is a blend of vodka, passion fruit, cherry, and ginger.
Alizé Peach
Alizé Apple
Alizé Pink Passion
Alizé Pineapple, introduced in 2019.
Alizé Mango, introduced in 2020.

Popular culture
Three bottles of Alizé can be seen in the music video of 'Boyfriend' a song by rap/grime artist Paigey Cakey.
Alizé is referenced in the song 'The Morning' by The Weeknd "drinking Alizé with our cereal for breakfast"
Alizé is the favorite alcoholic drink of actress Mo'Nique's character Nikki Parker from the UPN sitcom The Parkers.
Alizé is the title of a 2013 song by the rapper Bones
Alizé is the title of a 2013 instrumental by the rapper Spaceghostpurrp
Alizé is offered as one of the in-flight drinks, along with Colt 45, in the movie Soul Plane (2004). 
Alizé is referenced in 'DJ Paul & Juicy J - Drinkin' On Tha Alize'
In the music video for '3-Way (The Golden Rule)' by The Lonely Island feat. Justin Timberlake & Lady Gaga, Justin Timberlake's character is shown getting off a bus with a Gold Passion Alizé. The shot coincides with his line "Hop off the bus with the Alizé" in the song.
Alizé is referenced several times by Tupac Shakur, including in the songs 'Thug Passion' and ‘Can't C Me’.
Alizé is referenced in the 2Pac song 'How Do You Want It'
Alizé is referenced in the Tommy Wright III song 'Meet Yo Maker'
Alizé is referenced in the Notorious B.I.G. song 'Juicy'
Alizé is referenced in the Snoop Dogg song 'Let's Get Blown'
Alizé is referenced in the Camp Lo song 'Coolie High'
Alizé is referenced in the MF Doom song 'Red and Gold'
Alizé is referenced in the Quad City DJs song 'C'mon N' Ride It (The Train)'
Alizé is referenced in the St. Lunatics song 'Here We Come' from Free City (album) (2001)
Alizé is referenced in the Bizzy Bone song ‘Weedman’ from the compilation album “The Collection”, featuring the RnB group Bluelight.
Alizé is referenced in the Slum Village song Dirty from the album Detroit Deli (A Taste of Detroit) (2004)
Eminem references Alizé in “Say What You Say” on the album ‘The Eminem Show’ (2002), as well as mixing Alize with Nyquil in the Tim Westwood Freestyle (2010)
Alize is referenced by Nas in the song The Message on the album ‘It Was Written’ as well as ‘Memory Lane (Sittin' in da Park)' from ‘Illmatic’.
Alizé is mentioned in the teen novel "I Am Not Your Perfect Mexican Daughter" by Erika Sánchez (2017).
Mentioned in the song 'High All The Time' by rapper 50 Cent
Alizé is referenced in the song "Alcoholic" by Common Kings
Actor Idris Elba referred to Alizé in his March 9, 2019 opening monologue on Saturday Night Live as being present in abundance at a memorial service for Biggie Smalls, which he attended years ago following the artist’s death.
Alizé is referenced in an episode of Key & Peele, during a Dungeons and Dragons sketch.
Referred to in D-Block Europe song "Dismissive" on 2019 mixtape "Street Trauma".
Alizé is referenced in the 2014 song "9TS (90s Baby)" by Redlight.
Indiana Pacers power forward Alize Johnson is named after the drink.
Alizé is referenced in a number of songs by Jay-Z, including "Can I get A..."
Alizé is referred to in Bugzy Malone's 2021 single "Skeletons"
Alizé is the title of the 2022 smash-hit by Gino Bonazzi featuring Bradford bassline rap sensations the Bad Boy Chiller Crew
Alizé is referred to in "$hrimp Poboy" by the Suicideboys
Alizé is referenced in Season 3, Episode 8 (“Krazee-Eyez Killa”) of Curb Your Enthusiasm. 
Alizé is mentioned in Tosh.0 Season 2 Episode 20 “Angry Black Preacher”
Alizé is referenced in the Makaveli song Toss It Up

References

External links
 

Alcoholic drink brands
Cognac
Liqueurs